Jesse Tawhiao-Wardlaw (usually known as Wardlaw, born 13 January 2000) is an Australian rules footballer who plays for  in the AFL Women's competition (AFLW).

Wardlaw plays as a key forward and led Brisbane's goalkicking for the first time in 2020. Her breakout season as a power forward came in season seven when she won the AFL Women's leading goalkicker award with the highest average goal haul in the league at more than 2 goals a game.

Early life
Wardlaw was born in Ashburton, New Zealand to an Aucklander mother and Christchurch father. Both her mother's parents and father's parents are Maori. She migrated to Australia with her family at the age of 4. 

While growing up, Jesse's father would join in kick-to-kick with a rugby league ball. At Slacks Creek State School and John Paul College she participated in cross country and basketball, netball and touch rugby. A talented netballer, Wardlaw was chosen in the Queensland Under 17 and Under 19 state representative sides. Her first introduction to Australian rules was through her friends, who encouraged her to be part of the AFL 9s social non-contact team in the Yeronga competition and the umpire of one of these games Tayla Harris seeing significant potential in her to be successful recommended she play at club level. She started with Coorparoo junior women's before being part of the Brisbane South Under 17 representative team and the Queensland Under 18 side. During this time, Wardlaw was approached by the Brisbane Lions who signed her to their Academy program. 

AFLW Career

She made her debut in the Lions' round 1 game against  at Moreton Bay Central Sports Complex on 3 February 2019.

She was nominated for the AFLW Rising Star Award in Round 2, 2020, after kicking three goals in the Lions' win over Geelong. Wardlaw achieved selection in Champion Data's 2021 AFLW All-Star stats team, after coming runner up in the league for average marks inside 50 in the 2021 AFL Women's season, totalling 2.0 a game.

Wardlaw was celebrated by AFL Queensland on International Women's Day 2020 as a cross-coder who plays multiple sports.

References

External links
 

2000 births
Living people
Sportspeople from Logan, Queensland
Sportswomen from Queensland
Australian rules footballers from Queensland
Brisbane Lions (AFLW) players